The 7th Hussar Regiment (7e Régiment de Hussards) was a regiment of hussars in the French Army.

The Revolutionary Wars
First established as the 8th Hussar Regiment on 23 November 1792, it entered the French Revolutionary Army as the hussards de Lamothe. The unit was promoted to 7th Hussar Regiment on 4 June 1793 following the defection of the 4th Hussar Regiment to the counter revolutionary Armée des Émigrés.

The Napoleonic Wars

During the first reign of Napoleon the regiment would earn much fame and recognition. It was part of General Antoine Lasalle’s Hellish Brigade alongside the 5th Hussar Regiment, earning much respect for bravery and performance in battle, eventually winning over 5 battle honors, but their rise to prominence was slowed when Lasalle was killed at Wagram in 1809.

In 1814 it was renamed the régiment de hussards d'Orléans and on the Bourbon Restoration it took the name Colonel-général des hussards, briefly reverting to 7th Hussar Regiment during the Hundred Days before being disbanded in November 1815.
The 7th Hussars had several notable commanders including Édouard de Colbert-Chabanais, Marcellin Marbot (during the Hundred Days) and Hercule Corbineau. Future cavalry generals Louis Bro (1781–1844) and Antoine Fortuné Brack (1807–1813) also served with the regiment.

The 19th Century
In 1840 the cavalry unit was re-formed as the 7th Hussar Regiment out of elements of the 4th, 5th, 6th and 12th Mounted Chasseur Regiments and of the 5th Hussar Regiment.

It was finally disbanded in 1928.

The Algerian War
It was briefly re-formed as the 7th Hussar Regiment for the Algerian War between 1956 and 1959.

Commanders

 1792 : Colonel Lamothe
 1794 : Chef de Brigade Van Marisy
 1797 : Chef de Brigade Champeaux
 1803 : Colonel Rapp
 1803 : Colonel Marx
 1807 : Colonel Colbert-Chabanais
 1809 : Colonel Domon
 1809 : Colonel de Custines
 1810 : Colonel Eulner
 1814 : Colonel Marbot
 1840 : Colonel de Grouchy
 1847 : Colonel Grenier
 1857 : Colonel Fénis de Lacombe
 1865 : Colonel Chaussée
 1872 : Colonel prince de Bauffremont
 1876 : Colonel Des Roys
 1876 : Colonel Durdilly
 1878 : Colonel Bruneau
 1884 : Colonel Massiet
 1891 : Colonel Mulotte
 1894 : Colonel de Vergennes
 1896 : Colonel Buffet
 1914 : Colonel Lesieur-Desbrières
 1 November 1914 : Colonel Simon
 12 October 1915 - 27 March 1917: Colonel Jouinot-Gambetta
 1917 : Colonel Langlois
 1918 : Colonel Clorus

1792 establishments in France
Military units and formations disestablished in 1959
Cavalry regiments of France
Regiments of the Bourbon Restoration
Regiments of the French First Republic
Regiments of the First French Empire
Regiments of the July Monarchy
Regiments of France in the French Revolutionary Wars
20th-century regiments of France
Disbanded units and formations of France
Military units and formations established in 1792